The 1997–98 Football League (known as the Nationwide Football League for sponsorship reasons) was the 99th completed season of The Football League.

Champions Nottingham Forest and runners-up Middlesbrough won promotion back to the Premiership at the first time of asking. Charlton Athletic won the play-offs to end an eight-year absence from the top flight.

Reading were relegated in bottom place. They were joined on the last day of the season by Manchester City and Stoke City. The blue half of Manchester endured relegation to the third tier of the English league for the first time in its history, despite beating also doomed Stoke 5–2 away on the last day of the season, but neither fans took lightly to relegation, as mass football violence outside outshone the match. Bury, Portsmouth and Port Vale all won their games to avoid the drop.

Graham Taylor's second spell as manager brought instant success as Watford won the Division Two championship. They were joined by runners-up Bristol City and playoff winners Grimsby Town.

Going down to Division Three were Brentford, Plymouth Argyle, Carlisle United and Southend United. Brentford had been losing playoff finalists just 12 months earlier, Plymouth had been promoted to Division Two just two seasons earlier, Carlisle were newly promoted and Southend had endured their second successive relegation.

Macclesfield Town finished runners-up in Division Three to gain their second successive promotion, a year after winning the Conference. They were joined by champions Notts County, who won the title by 17 points and became the first team since World War II to secure promotion in March, third-placed Lincoln City and playoff winners Colchester United.

Doncaster Rovers suffered an English league record of 34 defeats and won just four games to lose their league status. They were replaced by Conference champions Halifax Town, who regained their league status five years after losing it.

First Division 

One season after being relegated from the Premier League, Nottingham Forest achieved an instant comeback as Division One champions, meaning that manager Dave Bassett had now taken charge of promotion-winning teams eight times in 18 seasons. They were joined on the final day of the season by Middlesbrough, who had only been relegated the previous season due to a points deduction. Charlton Athletic clinched the final promotion place in dramatic fashion, beating Sunderland on penalties after a thrilling match which ended 4-4 after extra time and restored the South London club to the top flight for the first time since 1990. Ipswich Town and Sheffield United were the beaten semi-finalists, while Birmingham City missed out on the playoffs on goals scored. Stockport County, in the league's second tier for the first time in decades, finished an impressive eighth. FA Cup semi-finalists Wolves finished ninth, missing out on the playoffs.

Reading's final season at Elm Park ended in relegation in bottom place, meaning that they would begin life at their impressive new Madejski Stadium as a Division Two rather than Division One side. A dramatic final day of the season saw Stoke City host Manchester City at their new Britannia Stadium, with both teams knowing that victory was their only chance of survival. In the end, the visitors triumphed 5-2 but both sides were relegated due to Portsmouth, Port Vale and QPR all winning and securing survival.

The season saw numerous managerial changes in Division One. Despite being on a run to the semi-finals of the FA Cup and being in the hunt for promotion to the Premier League, Nigel Spackman stood down in March after less than a year in charge of Sheffield United, with his assistant Steve Thompson taking charge for the crucial final weeks of the season. Steve Bruce, the Birmingham City captain, was then appointed player-manager at Bramall Lane. At the other end of the table, Terry Bullivant was sacked by Reading in March having only been appointed the previous summer, with the former Celtic manager Tommy Burns being appointed as his successor. Stoke City began the season with Chic Bates as manager, but a mid-season downturn in form saw his dismissal in January and the appointment of Chris Kamara, who won just one of his 14 games in charge and was dismissed with five games left to play and Stoke deep in the relegation battle. Alan Durban took charge for the final five games, but was unable to save the Potters from relegation. Manchester City sacked manager Frank Clark in February after just over a year in charge, and replaced him with the former Everton manager Joe Royle. QPR's dismal form saw manager Bruce Rioch replaced by West Bromwich Albion's Ray Harford in early December, with Harford's successor at The Hawthorns being Denis Smith, recruited from debt-ridden Oxford United. The new manager at the Manor Ground was Malcolm Shotton, who managed to guide the Thames Valley side to a secure mid table finish in spite of the club's rising debts, which resulted in construction of the club's new stadium being halted. Portsmouth sacked Terry Fenwick in February after three years in charge and replaced him with Alan Ball, the manager of their most recent promotion-winning side in 1987. Huddersfield Town's dismal start to the campaign saw Brian Horton sacked in September and replaced by Peter Jackson, who guided the Terriers to a secure mid table finish. Mike Walker, whose first spell in charge of Norwich City had seen a Premier League title challenge and a memorable UEFA Cup run, stood down at Carrow Road with several games still to play as Norwich headed for another disappointing mid table finish. After the season was over, the Carrow Road board of directors appointed Bruce Rioch as their sixth manager in as many years.

Table

Play-offs

Results

Top scorers

Maps

Second Division 
Having returned to the manager's seat at Watford following a disappointing 1996–97 season under Kenny Jackett, Graham Taylor guided Watford to the Division Two title to add to the three promotions he had won in his first spell at Vicarage Road between 1978 and 1982. John Ward, who had been dismissed by Bristol Rovers in 1996 after failing to deliver promotion, delivered the goods for their local rivals Bristol City, comfortably securing them promotion from Division Two as runners-up. The final promotion place was won by Grimsby Town, who in their first Wembley final victory defeated a Northampton Town side in hunt of a second successive promotion. 

Grimsby had already defeated favourites Fulham in the semi-finals, meaning that Mohammed Al Fayed's revolution at Craven Cottage was on hold for a season. Since buying the club for £30million the previous summer, Al Fayed had appointed Kevin Keegan as director of football and Ray Wilkins as head coach, as well as providing transfer funds which meant that Fulham were able to compete with the leading Division One clubs and even some Premier League sides in the transfer market, the biggest fee being the £2.25million they paid Blackburn Rovers for defender Chris Coleman. 

At the bottom end of the table, Alvin Martin endured a nightmare start to his managerial career as his Southend United side finished bottom of Division Two and suffered a second successive relegation. Carlisle United's dream of rising to the top of the English leagues under the ownership of Michael Knighton was becoming a nightmare as they suffered an instant relegation back to Division Three, despite the club's ambitious chairman taking charge of the first team for most of the season after axing Mervyn Day in the autumn. Plymouth Argyle were relegated to Division Three for the second time in four seasons. Brentford, beaten playoff finalists the previous season, went down on the final day of the season, with fallen giants Burnley being the lucky side who escaped relegation in the process. Surviving in Division Two was not enough to save the job of Burnley manager Chris Waddle, who was replaced soon afterwards by Bury manager Stan Ternent.

Table

Play-offs

Top scorers

Maps

Results

Third Division 

In his first full season as Notts County manager, Sam Allardyce took Notts County to the Division Three title with 99 points and made them the first Football League team to win promotion before the end of March, giving the Meadow Lane supporters some much needed cause for celebration after the previous six seasons had brought three relegations and a playoff defeat. Macclesfield Town finished runners-up to seal promotion in their first season as a Football League side, and were joined in the automatic promotion places by a Lincoln City side who reached the third tier for the first time in more than a decade. Colchester United clinched the final promotion place, beating Torquay United 1–0 in the Wembley promotion decider with a David Gregory goal. 

Doncaster Rovers were relegated from the Football League after a catastrophic season which saw them win just four league games and suffer a league record of 34 defeats. The club's future was then secured when chairman Ken Richardson, who stood accused of trying to set fire to the club's dilapidated Belle Vue stadium as part of an alleged insurance scam, stood down and was succeeded by new owner John Ryan, who set about rebuilding the club on and off the field and ensuring a swift return to the Football League. Brighton finished 23rd for the second successive season, but were never in any real danger of relegation this time due to Doncaster's dismal form throughout the season. Hull City endured one of the worst seasons in their history, finishing third from bottom and with team-strengthening prospects for new player-manager Mark Hateley being restricted by rising debts. It was a similarly low ebb for Cardiff City, whose 21st-place finish was the second worst of their history, while Swansea City's 20th-place finish was their lowest since 1975. 

Doncaster's place in the Football League was taken by Conference champions Halifax Town, who regained the league status which they had lost five years earlier.

Table

Play-offs

Top scorers

Maps

See also
1997–98 in English football

References
The tables below are reproduced here in the exact form that they can be found at The Rec.Sport.Soccer Statistics Foundation website, with home and away statistics separated. Play-off results are from the same website.

 
English Football League seasons